Griffing Flying Service, Inc. is a privately owned aviation company based in Port Clinton, Ohio. It operates on-demand passenger flights to islands in Lake Erie, as well as air charter services to the U.S., Canada, and The Bahamas.  The company also provides flight training, aerial tours and aircraft maintenance.

Griffing Flying Service is a family-operated business. Founded in 1937 by Harry Thomas Griffing, a former truck driver, by 2016 it was headed by Harry Thomas Griffing Jr., with Harry Thomas Griffing III as its chief pilot. The latter is the third generation of pilots in the family.

After seven years of negotiations, Griffing took over a rival, Island Airlines, in 1992. The deal included the rights to delivery agreements with the United States Postal Service and United Parcel Service. It had 18 employees and a fleet of eight aircraft in 2012. It then operated the  Griffing Sandusky Airport in Sandusky, Ohio but was preparing gradually to move its base to Erie–Ottawa International Airport in Ottawa County, where it had in any case operated during the winter since 2008. The move was completed by 2013.

In 2016, the company was named Business of the Year by the Ottawa County Improvement Corporation.

Fleet
Griffing Flying Service flies a fleet of small propeller-driven airplanes including:

References

External links
 

1937 establishments in Ohio
airlines based in Ohio
airlines established in 1937
charter airlines of the United States
privately held companies based in Ohio
transportation in Ottawa County, Ohio